Albanesi is an Italian surname meaning "Albanian", in reference to the Arbëreshë people (Italo-Albanians) of southern Italy. Among people who have the surname it is common in southern Italy and rare elsewhere in the country. Notable people with the surname include:

Angelo Albanesi (late 18th century), Italian engraver
Carlo Albanesi (1858–1926), Italian composer, pianist, teacher, and examiner
Meggie Albanesi (1899–1923), British stage and film actress, daughter of Carlo

See also
Albanese
Names of the Albanians and Albania

References

Italian-language surnames